Hilltop is a census-designated place (CDP) in Pike County, Georgia, United States. The population was 401 at the 2000 census.

Geography
Hilltop is located at  (33.103864, -84.433959).

Demographics

As of the census of 2000, there were 401 people, 119 households, and 91 families residing in the CDP. The racial makeup of the CDP was 11.97% White, 87.78% African American and 0.25% Native American.

There were 119 households, out of which 28.6% had children under the age of 18 living with them, 42.0% were married couples living together, 25.2% had a female householder with no husband present, and 23.5% were non-families. 18.5% of all households were made up of individuals, and 7.6% had someone living alone who was 65 years of age or older.  The average household size was 3.37 and the average family size was 3.84.

In the CDP, the population was spread out, with 29.7% under the age of 18, 10.2% from 18 to 24, 25.9% from 25 to 44, 23.9% from 45 to 64, and 10.2% who were 65 years of age or older.  The median age was 34 years. For every 100 females, there were 93.7 males.  For every 100 females age 18 and over, there were 88.0 males.

The median income for a household in the CDP was $22,188, and the median income for a family was $30,625. Males had a median income of $15,750 versus $20,000 for females. The per capita income for the CDP was $9,720.  About 19.8% of families and 29.3% of the population were below the poverty line, including 51.5% of those under age 18 and 20.0% of those age 65 or over.

Education
Hilltop Public Schools are part of the Pike County School District. The school district has one Pre-K building (lottery funded), one primary school (K-2), one elementary school (3-5), one middle school (6-8), a ninth grade academy and two high schools.

Michael Duncan, Ed. D. is the Superintendent of Schools.

References

Census-designated places in Pike County, Georgia
Census-designated places in Georgia (U.S. state)